Carrot thin leaf virus (CTLV) is a pathogenic plant virus of the family Potyviridae.

External links
ICTVdB - The Universal Virus Database: Carrot thin leaf virus
Family Groups - The Baltimore Method

Viral plant pathogens and diseases
Potyviruses